Rafha is a town in the north of Saudi Arabia, close to the border with Iraq. Rafha had a population of 80,544 at the 2010 Census. After Arar, it is the second largest city in the Northern Borders Region (also known as Al-Hudud ash Shamaliyah). Currently the Ministry of Housing is building over 600 new villas for the local population and others and making significant improvements to the local infrastructure.

Climate
Köppen-Geiger climate classification system classifies its climate as hot desert (BWh).

References 

 
Populated places in Northern Borders Province